USS Sturgeon  has been the name of three submarines of the United States Navy:

 USS Sturgeon (SS-25) was renamed  in 1911; E-2 was commissioned in 1912 and scrapped in 1922.

United States Navy ship names